Carl Engel (July 21, 1883 – May 6, 1944) was a French-born American pianist, composer, musicologist and publisher from Paris.  He was also president of G. Schirmer, Inc., a writer on music for The Musical Quarterly, and chief of the Music Division of the Library of Congress.

Compositions

Voice and Piano
Three Lyrics from the German; G. Saerchinger, 1906
We Met; W. Maxwell, 1907
Four Lyrics by C. Fabbri; G. Schirmer, 1908
Chansons intimes; G. Schirmer, 1910
Two Lyrics; G. Schirmer, 1911
Deux simples chansons; Boston Music Co., 1912
Trois epigrammes; G. Schirmer, 1914
Trois sonnets; G. Schirmer, 1914
Christmas Call; Boston Music Co., 1916
Three Songs; C. Fischer, 1917
We're In It: And We'll Win It; C. C. Birchard, 1918
The Never-Lonely Child; Boston Music Co., 1919
Three Poems of Amy Lowell; G. Schirmer, 1922

Violin and Piano
Chant Nuptial; C. Fischer, 1917
Triptych; Boston Music Co., 1920
Chanson frivole; G. Schirmer, 1922

Piano
Perfumes; C. Fischer, 1917
Presque valse; G. Schirmer, 1946

Choir
Dawn; C. C. Birchard, 1915
God Rest Our Glorious Land; C. C. Birchard, 1932
Lisette; Choudens, 1935
Charms of Love; Boston Music Co., 1939

Wind Band
For Honor and For Home; C. Fischer, 1917
Academic Processional March; G. Schirmer, 1938

Operetta
Way Down South in Dixie; C. C. Birchard, 1924

Works 
"Alla breve, from Bach to Debussy" (New York: G. Schirmer, 1921)  — short biographies of great composers

References

External links
 
 
 

1883 births
1944 deaths
20th-century French male classical pianists
American classical pianists
American male pianists
Musicians from Paris
20th-century American male musicians
20th-century American pianists
Members of the International Composers' Guild
French emigrants to the United States